= Suomen hauskin tavis =

Finnish comedy television series

Suomen hauskin tavis is a Finnish comedy program. The program is hosted by Elina Kottonen. The program started in 2017, and its second and last season aired in 2018.
